Yom HaAliyah, or Aliyah Day, is an Israeli national holiday celebrated annually according to the Jewish calendar on the tenth of the Hebrew month of Nisan to commemorate  the Jewish people entering the Land of Israel as written in the Hebrew Bible, which happened on the tenth of the Hebrew month of Nisan. The holiday was also established to acknowledge Aliyah, immigration of Jews to the Jewish state, as a core value of the State of Israel, and honor the ongoing contributions of Olim, Jewish immigrants, to Israeli society. Yom HaAliyah is also observed in Israeli schools on the seventh of the Hebrew month of Cheshvan.

The opening clause of the Yom HaAliyah Law states in Hebrew:

English translation:

History

Yom HaAliyah, as a modern holiday celebration that led to the Knesset law, began in 2009 as a grassroots community initiative and young Olim self-initiated movement in Tel Aviv, spearheaded by the TLV Internationals organization of the Am Yisrael Foundation. On June 21, 2016 the Twentieth Knesset voted in favor of codifying the grassroots initiative into law by officially adding Yom HaAliyah to the Israeli national calendar. The Yom HaAliyah bill was co-sponsored by Knesset members from different parties in a rare instance of cooperation across the political spectrum of the opposition and coalition. The key Knesset parliamentarians who initially worked on the final successful version of the Yom HaAliyah bill were Miki Zohar of Likud, Hilik Bar of Israeli Labor Party, and Michael Oren of Kulanu. There were previous failed attempts in other Knesset sessions to create similar legislation, none of which were related to the ultimate successful creation of the holiday, namely Knesset members Avraham Neguise, Yoel Razvozov, Robert Ilatov, Yaakov Katz, and Knesset aide Yishai Fleisher.

Significance
The original calendar date chosen for Yom HaAliyah, the tenth of Nisan, is laden with symbolism. Although a modern holiday created by the Knesset of Israel, the tenth of Nisan is a date of religious significance for the Jewish people as recounted in the Hebrew Bible and in traditional Jewish thought. Additionally, the observation date of 7 Cheshvan was chosen due to its proximity to the weekly Torah Portion of Lech Lecha, in which God commanded Abraham to go to the Land of Israel.

Biblical

On the tenth of Nisan, according to the biblical narrative in the Book of Joshua, Joshua leading the Israelites crossed the Jordan River at Gilgal into the Promised Land while carrying the Ark of the Covenant. It was thus the first documented "mass Aliyah." On that day, God commanded the Israelites to commemorate and celebrate the occasion by erecting twelve stones with the text of the Torah engraved upon them. The stones represented the entirety of the Jewish nation's twelve tribes and their gratitude for God's gift of the Land of Israel to them. The 10th of Nisan is also significant as it was the first Shabbat HaGadol that took place five days before the Israelites left Egypt beginning The Exodus. This is also the date that Moses's sister Miriam died and according to the Biblical narrative her well that miraculously traveled with the Israelites through the desert dried up (Numbers 20:1–2).

The tenth of the Hebrew month of Nisan, which is the first month according to the ordering of the Hebrew calendar, is referenced in association with Aliyah multiple times within the Biblical text.

Jewish people

Entering the Land of Israel en masse has been significant for the Jewish people both historically and in modern times. Besides the individual religious implication of those Torah laws that can only be followed in Israel as opposed to when Jews are living around the world, there are traditional precepts that uniquely effect the Jewish people as an entire nation after having made Aliyah.
  When the Israelites crossed the Jordan River into the Land of Israel for the first time on the 10th of Nisan, according to traditional Jewish teachings they took upon themselves a special dimension to the concept of "arevut" or "mutual responsibility". Arevut is known also by the Talmudic Hebrew/Aramaic maxim mentioned in Shevuot 39a, "Kol Yisrael Areivim Zeh baZeh", "כל ישראל ערבים זה בזה", meaning "All Jews are Responsible for One Another". The Maharal of Prague, Rabbi Judah Loew ben Bezalel, comments on the Talmudic statement that the Israelites were not truly responsible for one another until after they had crossed the Jordan. Arevut implies an obligation on all Jews to ensure that other Jews have their spiritual and basic needs taken care of. Simply by virtue of being a Jew living in the Land of Israel, one has an elevated responsibility for the well-being of other Jews. Jews are expected to be a “light unto the nations”, presenting a model of morality and brotherly responsibility. Specifically in terms of "Kol Yisrael", the hope is that other nations around the globe will also see how Jews help each other when living in Israel and will try to do the same for their own people.

Religious

According to Jewish religious tradition, upon making Aliyah by crossing the Jordan River to enter the Land of Israel, Joshua composed the Aleinu prayer thanking God. This idea was first cited in the Kol Bo of the late 14th Century.

Several medieval commentators noticed that Joshua’s shorter birth name, Hosea, appears in the first few verses of Aleinu in reverse acrostic: ע – עלינו, ש – שלא שם, ו – ואנחנו כורעים, ה – הוא אלוקינו. The Teshuvot HaGeonim, a Geonic responsum, discussed that Joshua composed the Aleinu because although the Israelites had made Aliyah to the Promised Land, they were surrounded by other peoples, and he wanted the Jews to draw a clear distinction between themselves, who knew and accepted the sovereignty of God, and those nations of the world which did not. In the modern era, religious Jews still pray the Aliyah inspired Aleinu three times daily, including on the High Holidays. The Aleinu prayer begins:

State of Israel

Aliyah ("ascent") is the immigration of Jews from the diaspora to the Land of Israel. Also defined as "the act of going up", "making Aliyah" by moving to the Land of Israel is one of the most basic tenets of Judaism and therefore Zionism. The State of Israel's Law of Return gives Jews, and in some cases their descendants, automatic rights regarding residency and Israeli citizenship.

From the modern founding of the State of Israel, honoring Aliyah as a core value of the nation and Israel as the Homeland for the Jewish people is evident even in the text of the Israeli Declaration of Independence, most profoundly in the opening few lines:

Aliyah as a core value of the State of Israel can be seen in its national anthem, Hatikvah, "The Hope", which was adapted from a poem by the 19th century Jewish poet, Naftali Herz Imber.

Honoring Aliyah has also been at the core of the State of Israel's religious sector. The Prayer for the Welfare of the State of Israel is a prayer said in many Jewish synagogues on Shabbat and on Jewish holidays, both in Israel and around the globe. The prayer requests divine providence for the State of Israel, its leaders, and that God helps with Aliyah, namely that still exiled Jewish People be gathered back into the Land of Israel.

The prayer was instituted in 1948 by the Sephardic and Ashkenazic Chief Rabbis of the newly formed State of Israel, respectively Rabbi Ben-Zion Meir Hai Uziel and Rabbi Yitzhak HaLevi Herzog with assistance by Nobel laureate Shmuel Yosef Agnon.

Jewish thought

Aliyah is an important Jewish religious concept and a fundamental component of Zionism. For much of Jewish history, the majority of the Jewish People have lived in the diaspora where Aliyah was developed as a national aspiration for the Jewish People. It is enshrined in Israel's Law of Return, which accords any Jew (deemed as such by halakha and Israeli secular law) the legal right to assisted immigration and settlement in Israel, as well as Israeli citizenship.

Someone who "makes Aliyah" is called an "Oleh" (m.; pl. "Olim") or "Olah" (f.; pl. "Olot"). Many religious Jews espouse Aliyah as a return to the Promised Land, and regard it as the fulfillment of God's biblical promise to the descendants of the Hebrew patriarchs Abraham, Isaac, and Jacob. Rabbi Moshe Ben Nachman, also known as Nachmanides or the Ramban, includes making Aliyah in his enumeration of the 613 commandments.

The Hebrew Bible is laden with references to a future when the Jewish People would have a mass return to the Land of Israel. The Bible recounts that when God sent the Jews to exile from the Holy Land approximately 2,500 years ago, He made a promise about the future of Aliyah:

God promised that one day, He would gather His children from the four corners of the earth, and bring them back home, to the Land of Israel:
 
 

In the Talmud, at the end of tractate Ketubot, the Mishnah says:

The discussion on this passage in the Mishnah emphasizes the importance of living in Israel:

Sifre says that the mitzvah (commandment) of living in Eretz Yisrael is as important as all the other mitzvot combined. There are many mitzvot such as shmita, the sabbatical year for farming, which can only be fulfilled in the Land of Israel.

According to the traditional Jewish ordering of books of the Tanakh (Old Testament), the very last word of the last book in the original Hebrew (2 Chronicles 36:23) is veya‘al, a jussive verb form derived from the same root as "Aliyah", meaning "and let him go up" (to Jerusalem in the Land of Israel).

As the tenth of Nisan occurs a few days before the Passover holiday, when Israeli schools are not in session, the school system will also honor Aliyah on the seventh of the Hebrew month of Cheshvan. That date is also symbolic as the Torah portion read in synagogues that week, Lekh Lekha, relates the story of how the biblical patriarch Abraham is ordered by God to leave his home, his birthplace, and his family and go up to the Land of Israel. This is also the date that the additional prayer for rain is added into the Amidah, and recited three times a day by Jews in Israel.

Modern

Jay M. Shultz, President of the Am Yisrael Foundation, the initiator and driving force behind the creation of the Israeli national holiday Yom HaAliyah, believes that the holiday will enable Jews...

Although it was not a reoccurring holiday, the first instance of a modern public celebration honoring an 'Aliyah Day' about Jewish immigrants settling the Land of Israel was hosted by Keren HaYesod in Tel Aviv on the second of November 1950. 

The first modern public Israeli celebration of Aliyah was instituted in 1948 by Israel's first Prime Minister David Ben-Gurion, named "Yom Kibbutz Galuyot", “ יום קיבוץ גלויות” or "In-gathering of the Exiles Day".

See also

References

Aliyah
Nisan observances
Cheshvan
National holidays
Public holidays in Israel
Zionism
Land of Israel
Immigration to Israel
Israeli culture
Society of Israel
Joshua